At the time of Queen Elizabeth I, Richard Chapman (born 1520, and died c.1592) was the owner of a private shipyard at Deptford, had the title of 'Queen's Master Shipwright,' and had been involved in the construction of river defences along the Thames, along with Peter Pett and Mathew Baker, two other important shipwrights of the time. Chapman was Master Shipwright of Woolwich and Deptford and built the first Ark Royal (initially ordered as a private venture as the Ark Ralegh, but taken over for the Queen while still on the stocks).

Chapman's father, John, was also a Master Shipwright and he also had strong ties to the important shipbuilding family, the Petts as his mother was Ann Pett and he was raised in the Pett household. The Chapman family itself, however, included several mariners whose origins appear to be in Devon and shipwrights who lived at Greenwich, working at this craft since the reign of the King Edward Ist (1239–1307).

Richard's son, Edmund Chapman, became 'Chief Joiner' to the Queen and owned significant property in Greenwich. Edmund provided land for the almshouses named 'Queen Elizabeth College', founded in 1574, and himself lived at 'Swanne House.'

External links 
Queen Elizabeth's College

Chapman, Richard
Chapman, Richard
1590s deaths
16th-century English people